"Ordinary People" is a song by American recording artist John Legend. It was written and produced by Legend and will.i.am for his debut album Get Lifted (2004). It was released as the album's second single and later certified gold by the RIAA. Critics were positive towards the song, praising it for its raw emotion and simplicity. At the 48th Annual Grammy Awards "Ordinary People" received three nominations for Song of the Year, Best R&B Song and Best Male R&B Vocal Performance, ultimately winning the latter.  The song appears on Now 19.

Music video 
The music video for "Ordinary People", directed by Chris Milk and Legend's then-label boss Kanye West, features Legend playing a grand piano in an all-white space, while couples and families fight and reconcile around and in front of the piano. For the final minute of the video, Legend is joined by a string section and a harmonica (played offscreen). Legend walks to and from the piano with a glass of water, as a short bookending to the video proper.

Composition
The main chord progression is derived from the introduction to Stevie Wonder's "My Cherie Amour", transposed to the key of F Major. This is punctuated in the music video version, when the string section and harmonica are brought in at the last chorus of the song.

The song's lyrical themes include contrast, contradiction, guilt, doubt and fear.

Legend sings about how people make errors of judgment in relationships ("I know I misbehaved/And you've made your mistakes/And we both still got room left to grow."), and that fighting and making up in the end is a regular obstacle: "And though love sometimes hurts/I still put you first/And we'll make this thing work/But I think we should take it slow."  The lyrics include parallel structure to address the common ups-and-downs of maintaining a relationship: "Maybe we'll live and learn/Maybe we'll crash and burn/Maybe you'll stay/Maybe you'll leave/Maybe you'll return/Maybe another fight/Maybe we won't survive/Maybe we'll grow, we never know."  The song's title itself is taken from its chorus, "We're just ordinary people/We don't know which way to go/'Cause we're ordinary people/Maybe we should take it slow."

Legend explained the song's lyrical content in the book Chicken Soup For the Soul: The Story Behind The Song: "The idea for the song is that relationships are difficult and the outcome uncertain. If a relationship is going to work, it will require compromise and, even then, it is not always going to end the way you want it to. No specific experience in my life led me to the lyrics for this song, although my parents were married twice to each other and divorced twice from each other. Their relationship is, of course, one of my reference points, but I didn't write this to be autobiographical or biographical. It is just a statement about relationships and my view on them."

Reception
Critics were overwhelmingly positive towards "Ordinary People", many of whom complimented the song's juxtaposition of simple stark piano and John Legend's vocal range.  Entertainment Weekly noted "Ordinary People" as being both "the simplest" and "perhaps the most perfectly realized song" of the Get Lifted album, describing it as "an exquisite ballad" that is "both immediately familiar and intensely exotic." A review from The Guardian  called the song "a real gem", and lauded further: "[I]t's not only sonically arresting but lyrically reflective. Refusing to tie up loose ends, Legend is ambivalent about the relationship described in the song, admitting that there's 'no fairy-tale conclusion'. Good for him."  PopMatters was favorable towards the single, stating it "is representative of true talent."  Jonathan Forgang, reviewing for Stylus magazine, stated: "'Ordinary People,' the first of the piano and voice ballads, is a bit more derivative than the earlier tracks but expertly performed. Legend's voice has a naked quality to it, warm and full without any of the drawbacks of virtuosity." The Times thought the song was full of "remorseful reflection" and said that "the album as a whole is a stunning advertisement for the less-is-more, from-the-soul approach, and Legend’s extraordinary voice (alternately angelic keen and cracked rasp) and piano-playing are equalled in quality by the depth of his songs."

On 14 April 2012, the song was performed on BBC's The Voice UK by semi-finalist Jaz Ellington as a second song (requested by Jessie J), resulting in some members of the UK public buying the track on iTunes. The song  re-entered the Official UK Top 40 at number 27 on 15 April, and the following week climbed to number 4.

Cover versions
 George Benson and Al Jarreau covered the song for their 2006 album Givin' It Up.
 Asher Book performs the song in the 2009 film Fame. Book's version is available on the soundtrack to the film.
 Aloe Blacc covered the song as Gente Ordinaria, singing it in Spanish.
 Becky Hill and Jaz Ellington covered the song on the first series of The Voice UK, which led to the song re-entering the chart at number 4.
 Mathai covered the song in the first live show of season two of The Voice US
 Candice Glover covered the song during the semi final (top 20) live show of the 12th season of American Idol.
 Nathan Sykes covered this song during his Sykes Secret Shows showcase on July 5, 2015

Personnel
Produced by John Legend
Engineered by Anthony Kilhoffer, Andy Manganello and Michael Peters
Assistant engineers: Mike Eleopoulos, Pablo Arraya and Val Brathwaite
Mixed by Manny Marroquin at Larrabee Studios, LA
Assistant mix engineer: Jared Robbins
Vocals and piano by John Legend

Recorded at Record Plant, LA and Sony Music Studios

Track listing

CD single 
 "Ordinary People" (Album Version) - 4:40
 "Ordinary People" (Johnny Douglas Radio Edit) - 3:34
 "Ordinary People" (Live at The Scala) - 7:12
 "Ordinary People" (Heavy Metal Remix) - 4:50
 "Ordinary People" (Video) - 4:55

12" vinyl 
A
 "Ordinary People" (Johnny Douglas Remix) - 5:01
 "Ordinary People" (Johnny Douglas Remix Instrumental) - 4:13
B
 "Ordinary People" (Heavy Metal Remix) - 4:50
 "Ordinary People" (Heavy Remix Instrumental) - 4:50
 "Ordinary People" (Album Version) - 4:40

Charts and certifications

Weekly charts

Year-end charts

Certifications

Release history

References

External links
 

2005 singles
Black-and-white music videos
Columbia Records singles
GOOD Music singles
John Legend songs
Pop ballads
Music videos directed by Kanye West
Contemporary R&B ballads
Song recordings produced by will.i.am
Songs written by John Legend
Songs written by will.i.am